SS Samleyte was a Liberty ship built in the United States during World War II. She was transferred to the British Ministry of War Transportation (MoWT) upon completion.

Construction
Samleyte was laid down on 7 March 1944, under a Maritime Commission (MARCOM) contract, MC hull 2355, by J.A. Jones Construction, Brunswick, Georgia; sponsored by Mrs. Palmer Hoyt, and launched on 20 April 1944.

History
She was turned over to the British Ministry of War Transport, on 29 April 1944. On 4 November 1947, she was laid up in the US National Defense Reserve Fleet, in the James River Group, Lee Hall, Virginia. While there, she was used for experimenting the use of cathodic protection (CP) as a preservation method. She was sold to Bethlehem Steel Company, on 17 July 1959, and removed from the fleet on 21 July 1959.

References

Bibliography

 
 
 
 
 

 

Liberty ships
Ships built in Brunswick, Georgia
1944 ships
James River Reserve Fleet
Liberty ships transferred to the British Ministry of War Transport